Piz Posta Biala (3,074 m) is a mountain of the Glarus Alps, located north of Sumvitg in the canton of Graubünden. It lies on the range between the Val Russein and the Val Punteglias, south of Piz Urlaun.

References

External links
 Piz Posta Biala on Hikr

Mountains of the Alps
Mountains of Graubünden
Mountains of Switzerland
Sumvitg